Abdulellah Al-Nassar (Arabic:عبد الإله النصار) is a Saudi footballer who plays as a winger.

References

Living people
Saudi Arabian footballers
1991 births
Al Nassr FC players
Al-Shoulla FC players
Al-Orobah FC players
Al-Bukayriyah FC players
Al-Washm Club players
Sportspeople from Riyadh
Saudi First Division League players
Saudi Professional League players
Saudi Second Division players
Association football wingers